The 1971–72 season was Sport Lisboa e Benfica's 68th season in existence and the club's 38th consecutive season in the top flight of Portuguese football, covering the period from 1 July 1971 to 30 June 1972. Benfica competed domestically in the Primeira Divisão and the Taça de Portugal, and participated in the European Cup after winning the previous league.

After recovering the title in the past season, Hagan remained for second season. He strengthened his team by adding Vítor Baptista, Artur Correia and Rui Rodrigues. To off-set, José Torres departed the club, alongside others, such as Jorge Calado and Jacinto Santos. Benfica began their league campaign by beating Porto in Estádio das Antas, only to be stopped a week later by 
CUF. They responded with a string of consecutive wins that propelled them into first place on 31 October. They drew again in the following week, now with Boavista and were caught at the top. In the European Cup, Benfica eliminated Wacker in the first round and CSKA Sofia in the second. Domestically, in November, Benfica began a nine-match winning run that allowed them to open a comfortable lead at the top. They drew again in February but that did not stop their momentum, and their continued collecting consecutive wins, five more, until their experienced their first league defeat on 26 March, at the hands of Barreirense. In the European Cup, Benfica faced Feyenoord in the quarter-finals, beating them 5–2 on aggregate but were stopped in the semi-finals by Ajax.
Afterwards, Benfica sealed their 19th league title and won their sixth double after beating Sporting in the Taça de Portugal Final

Season summary

Benfica started the new season as reigning Primeira Divisão holders after they recovered that honour in 1970–71. English manager Jimmy Hagan began his second season in charge, still with José Augusto as his assistant. In the transfer window, Benfica's major signings were Vítor Baptista for the offence and Artur Correia and Rui Rodrigues for the defence. Historic player José Torres departed the club for Vitória de Setúbal in the deal involving Vítor Baptista. Other departures included Jorge Calado and Jacinto Santos. The pre-season began on 20 July with medical tests, and the first preparation game was on 31 July with Arsenal. Afterwards, Benfica went on a tour for England, where they played Arsenal again, among other teams. In late August, Benfica had a second tour, now in Italy and competed in the Ramón de Carranza Trophy in Spain. They concluded the preparations by winning the Taça de Honra against Belenenses on 8 September.

The season began on 12 September with visit to Estádio das Antas to play Porto. Benfica won 3–1 with goals from Eusébio and Artur Jorge. Three days later, Benfica started their European Cup campaign with a 4–0 win against Wacker. On the 19, Benfica dropped their first points in the league after a surprising 1–1 draw with CUF. That left them in fourth place, one-point behind leaders Vitória de Setúbal and Sporting. On 26 September, Benfica defeated Vitória de Setúbal away and pass them on the league table, placing them  in third, one-less than leader Sporting. The month closed with another victory in the European Cup, for a 7–1 aggregate win against Wacker. In October, Benfica won all of his league matches but only reached first place on the 31 after a home win against União de Tomar. In Europe, Benfica faced CSKA Sofia for the second round, beating them 2–1 on aggregate and qualifying for the quarter-finals. On 7 November, Benfica played Boavista on the road and drew 2–2 and were therefore caught in first place by Sporting. That situation was short lived as Benfica began a winning streak that lasted until February. Nine consecutive wins, including a 3–0 win in Estádio de Alvalade against Sporting, allowed Benfica to quickly build a comfortable lead. On match-day 12, the lead already stood at three-points, and Benfica lapped the first half of the Primeira Divisão with a five more points than second-place, Vitória de Setúbal.  They began the second part of the season by beating Porto in the Clássico, but two-weeks later, they were finally stopped in the home draw to Vitória de Setúbal. 

Benfica responded well and kept on winning, increasing their lead to eight-points by match-day 23 after five consecutive wins. In the European Cup, on 8 March, the team was defeated in first leg of the quarter-finals by Feyenoord. Benfica complained of referee Kunze as António Simões described: "I never thought I would find a referee like this. Dishonest is all I can say about him.". On 22 March, Benfica received Feyenoord and won 5–1. With the game in 2–1 on the 80th minute, which qualified Feyenoord; Benfica scored three goals in the last ten minutes to progress to the semi-finals. The win was seen as a revenge because Ernst Happel had repeatedly labelled Benfica as an inferior team. Four days later, Benfica lost for the first time in the Primeira Divisão. On match-day 24, Barreirense beat Benfica by 1–0 and prevented their goal of finishing the league undefeated. Afterwards, Eusébio said that the game against Feyenoord could not serve as an excuse. Benfica entered in April still in all competitions and their first match was the semi-finals of the European Cup. Facing another Dutch team, Ajax from Johan Cruyff, Benfica was defeated in Amsterdam by 1–0. In the home reception to Ajax, Benfica attempted to qualify for their sixth final, but drew 0–0 and were eliminated. Hagan's tactics were blamed by the press for the elimination, while Jaime Graça targeted the referee for annulling a clean goal for Benfica. The team finished the month by playing two matches for the Taça de Portugal. On 23 April, they defeated Cova da Piedade by 6–3 for the quarter-finals and on 30, they thrashed Porto by 6–0 in the semi-finals. They ensured their fourth consecutive final and were meeting Sporting in the Taça de Portugal Final, repeating the same teams of the last three finals. The Primeira Divisão resumed on 7 May, with Benfica beating Académica de Coimbra by 3–1, thus confirming their 19th league title. With three matches still to go, Benfica tied the season 1960–61 for the club record of earliest match-day to win the league. They finished the campaign with 55 points in 60 possible and Artur Jorge was Bola de Prata for league top-scorer with 27 goals. The season ended on 4 June with the Taça de Portugal Final where Benfica narrowly beat Sporting by 3–2. Benfica scored first by Eusébio on the 20th minute, but Sporting responded with two goals in the second half. Eusébio scored again to level the game on 2 goals on the 69th minute, requiring the need of extra-time, where on the 117th minute, he scored another to seal the win. It was Eusébio's first hat-trick in a Taça de Portugal Final. Benfica had won another league and cup double, their six double.

Competitions

Overall record

Primeira Divisão

League table

Results by round

Matches

Taça de Portugal

European Cup

First round

Second round

Quarter-finals

Semi-finals

Friendlies

Player statistics
The squad for the season consisted of the players listed in the tables below, as well as staff member Jimmy Hagan (manager), José Augusto (assistant manager), Fernando Neves (Director of Football).

Transfers

In

Out

Out by loan

Notes

References

Bibliography
 
 
 

S.L. Benfica seasons
Benfica
Portuguese football championship-winning seasons